is a Shinto shrine located in the city of Gifu, Gifu Prefecture, Japan.

History
This shrine was originally built in 860. During the Middle Ages, it was at a strategic location in Mino Province, which led to it being the site of many battles. At the time of the Battle of Sekigahara in 1600, the Oda clan used this shrine as their place of prayer. When they were attacked by the forces of Tokugawa Ieyasu, part of the temple was burned to the ground.

Major Rituals
 February 22: Yearly prayers
 Second Saturday of April: Spring Fire Festival
 October 10: Fall Fire Festival
 November 22: Niiname Festival

References

Buildings and structures in Gifu
Shinto shrines in Gifu Prefecture